South Lewis County Airport , also known as Ed Carlson Memorial Field, is a county-owned public-use airport in Lewis County, Washington, United States. It is located three nautical miles (4 mi, 6 km) north of the central business district of Toledo, Washington.

This airport is included in the FAA's National Plan of Integrated Airport Systems for 2011–2015, which categorized it as a general aviation facility.

Facilities and aircraft 
The airport covers an area of 170 acres (69 ha) at an elevation of 374 feet (114 m) above mean sea level. It has one runway designated 6/24 with an asphalt surface measuring 4,479 by 150 feet (1,365 x 46 m).

For the 12-month period ending April 30, 2008, the airport had 36,363 aircraft operations, an average of 99 per day: 97% general aviation and 3% military.
At that time there were 57 aircraft based at this airport: 79% single-engine, 11% multi-engine, 2% jet, 4% helicopter, and 5% ultralight.

References

External links 
 Aerial image as of 21 June 1990 from USGS The National Map
 

Airports in Washington (state)
Transportation buildings and structures in Lewis County, Washington